Sumon (Popularly known as Master Sumon) is a Bangladeshi film actor. He won the Bangladesh National Film Award for Best Child Artist for the film Ashikkhito (1978) which he shared with Azad Rahman Shakil.

Selected films
 Shikriti (1972)
 Ashikkhito (1978)
 Chhutir Ghonta (1980)
 Puroskar (1983)

Awards and nominations
National Film Awards

References

External links

Bangladeshi film actors
Best Child Artist National Film Award (Bangladesh) winners
Year of birth missing (living people)
Living people